Rovaeanthus is a genus of flowering plants belonging to the family Rubiaceae.

Its native range is southern Mexico to Central America. It is found in El Salvador, Guatemala, Honduras, Mexico and Nicaragua.

The genus name of Rovaeanthus is in honour of Johan H. E. Rova (fl. 1990 – 2002), a Swedish botanist at the University of Gothenburg. 
It was first described and published in Acta Bot. Hung. Vol.46 on page 130 in 2004.

Species, according to Kew:
Rovaeanthus strigosus 
Rovaeanthus suffrutescens

References

Rubiaceae
Rubiaceae genera
Plants described in 2004
Flora of Southeastern Mexico
Flora of Southwestern Mexico
Flora of Veracruz
Flora of Central America